Why Get Married? is a 1924 American-Canadian silent drama film directed by Paul Cazeneuve and starring Andrée Lafayette, Jack Perrin, and Helen Ferguson.

Plot
As described in a film magazine review, Marcia Wainwright, a young married woman, works in the Robert Strong offices. Janet Carroll, another employee, leaves her job to be a housewife when she weds James Allen. Jack Wainwright, Marcia's husband, meets with misfortune and becomes a freight handler. Marcia is promoted and a breach widens between her and her husband Jack. Rodney Strong begins to pay attention to Marcia and writes her anonymous letters which injure her and the Allens by hinting at a liaison between Marcia and James Allen. Jack Wainwright makes good, discovers Rodney's plot, thrashes him, and wins back the affections of his wife. Marcia quits her position. The Allens are reconciled.

Cast

References

Bibliography
 Connelly, Robert B. The Silents: Silent Feature Films, 1910-36, Volume 40, Issue 2. December Press, 1998.
 Munden, Kenneth White. The American Film Institute Catalog of Motion Pictures Produced in the United States, Part 1. University of California Press, 1997.

External links

 

1924 films
1924 drama films
1920s English-language films
Canadian drama films
American silent feature films
Canadian silent feature films
Silent American drama films
American black-and-white films
Films directed by Paul Cazeneuve
Associated Exhibitors films
1920s American films
1920s Canadian films